Elias Uppheim Skogvoll (born 5 May 1996) is a Norwegian football midfielder who plays for Tromsdalen.

Hailing from Ballangen, he made his senior debut for Ballangen on the sixth tier in 2011 before playing youth football for Mjølner and Tromsø. He also represented Norway as a youth international In Tromsø he also made his senior debut, in the 2014 Norwegian Football Cup match against Mjølner. To play regular senior football, he joined Tromsdalen in 2015. Here he won promotion to the 2017 1. divisjon, but the next year he stepped down one notch to play for third-tier Mjølner. Ahead of the 2020 season he was signed by Odd and made his first-tier debut in June 2020 against Strømsgodset.

References

1996 births
Living people
People from Ballangen
Norwegian footballers
Tromsø IL players
Tromsdalen UIL players
FK Mjølner players
Odds BK players
Grorud IL players
Norwegian Second Division players
Norwegian First Division players
Eliteserien players
Association football midfielders
Norway youth international footballers
Sportspeople from Nordland